Nataliya Vladimirovna Shepelina  (Наталья Владимировна Шепелина, born 24 February 1981) was a Russian female water polo player. She was a member of the Russia women's national water polo team, playing as driver. 

She was a part of the  team at the 2004 Summer Olympics, 2008 Summer Olympics, and 2007 World Aquatics Championships.

On club level she played for Uralochka Zlatoust in Russia.

See also
 List of World Aquatics Championships medalists in water polo

References

External links
 
http://www.gettyimages.com/photos/natalia-shepelina?excludenudity=true&sort=mostpopular&mediatype=photography&phrase=natalia%20shepelina&family=editorial
http://www.zimbio.com/photos/Natalia+Shepelina/Laura+Lopez+Ventosa

1981 births
Living people
Russian female water polo players
Water polo players at the 2004 Summer Olympics
Water polo players at the 2008 Summer Olympics
Olympic water polo players of Russia
Sportspeople from Chelyabinsk
Asian Games medalists in water polo
Water polo players at the 2010 Asian Games
Water polo players at the 2014 Asian Games
Asian Games silver medalists for Kazakhstan
Asian Games bronze medalists for Kazakhstan
Medalists at the 2010 Asian Games
Medalists at the 2014 Asian Games